Matthew Angelo Taormina (born October 20, 1986) is an American former professional ice hockey defenseman. He played with the New Jersey Devils and the  Tampa Bay Lightning of the National Hockey League (NHL).

Playing career
As a youth, Taormina played in the 2000 Quebec International Pee-Wee Hockey Tournament with the Detroit Honeybaked minor ice hockey team.

Taormina began his amateur career playing in the North American Hockey League with the Texarkana Bandits. Earning a place in the Second All-Star Team, the All-Rookie Team and winning the NAHL's Rookie of the year, Matt then committed to play collegiate hockey in the Hockey East with Providence College. With a selection to the Hockey East Second All-Star Team as a junior, Matt progressed to join the Binghamton Senators of the American Hockey League after completing his senior year at the end of the 2008–09 season.

As an undrafted free agent, Taormina was signed to an AHL contract for the 2009–10 season by the New Jersey Devils on August 20, 2009. Taormina scored 50 points in 75 games to lead the Lowell Devils in assists and signed a one-year contract extension with the Devils on February 26, 2010.

With an impressive training camp and with the advantage of familiarity under head coach John MacLean with Lowell, Matt opened the 2010–11 season on the New Jersey Devils roster. In his fifth game, Matt scored his first NHL goal on October 15, 2010, a powerplay goal, against Craig Anderson of the Colorado Avalanche in a 3-2 defeat.

Taormina signed a one-year two-way contract with the Tampa Bay Lightning of the NHL on July 6, 2012.

In his second season with Tampa Bay, at the 2013–14 trade deadline, Taormina was traded by the Lightning, along with Dana Tyrell, to the Columbus Blue Jackets in exchange for Jonathan Marchessault and Dalton Smith on March 5, 2014.

On September 26, 2014, the Worcester Sharks announced they had signed Taormina to a one-year AHL contract. In the 2014–15 season, Taormina returned to form to lead the Sharks in scoring from the blueline with 38 points in 72 games.

On July 1, 2015, Taormina returned to the Tampa Bay Lightning, in signing a one-year, two-way contract as a free agent. On April 19, 2016, Taormina played in first career Stanley Cup Playoffs game, which was a 3-2 Lightning win over the Detroit Red Wings.

On June 28, 2016 the Lightning announced the re-signing of Taormina to a one-year, two-way contract. Taormina skated in three games with the Lighting that season. Taormina also skated in three Stanley Cup playoff games in 2016. He also appeared in 61 games with the Crunch last season, recording 13 goals and 41 points. This ranked Taormina second among Crunch defensemen for points and led all defensemen for goals with 13.

On March 17, 2017, Taormina was named a permanent alternate captain of the Syracuse Crunch. On April 6, 2017, Taromina was named to the 2016–17 AHL All-Star First Team. On April 7, 2017, Taromina was awarded the Eddie Shore Award as the AHL's outstanding defenseman for the 2016–17 season.

On July 1, 2017, Taormina left the Lightning as a free agent and signed a two-year, two-way deal with the Montreal Canadiens. Near the beginning of the season, Taormina was named an alternate captain of the Laval Rocket along with Chris Terry, with Byron Froese being the first captain in the team’s history.

Prior to the 2018–19 season, and having missed pre-season through injury, on October 1, Taormina and Rinat Valiev were traded by the Canadiens to the Calgary Flames in exchange for Brett Kulak.

Career statistics

Awards and honors

References

External links

1986 births
Living people
Albany Devils players
Binghamton Senators players
Laval Rocket players
Lowell Devils players
Sportspeople from Warren, Michigan
Ice hockey players from Michigan
New Jersey Devils players
Providence Friars men's ice hockey players
Springfield Falcons players
Stockton Heat players
Syracuse Crunch players
Tampa Bay Lightning players
Undrafted National Hockey League players
Worcester Sharks players
American men's ice hockey defensemen